Kakure nenbutsu (隠れ念仏), or "hidden Amida Buddhism", was a form of Jōdo Shinshū Buddhism secretly practiced on the Japanese island of Kyushu, in the Hitoyoshi Domain and Satsuma Domain, during a period of religious persecution from 1555 to the declaration of freedom of religion during the Meiji Restoration. Because it became a secret lineage, some kakure nenbutsu lineages continued into the mid-20th century.

Origins
The kakure nenbutsu era began with the ikkō-ikki, violent uprisings of peasants encouraged and organized by the leadership of Shinshū splinter group Ikkō-shū. The ikkō-ikki were part of a period of political instability in Japan and the threat they posed to leadership was very real. In response to the uprisings, in Kyushu all forms of Shinshū were banned.

Secrecy
Some peasants who believed in Shinshū began meeting in secret, usually in mountain caves some distance from any inhabited area. Others would make secret pilgrimages to temples in neighboring domains.

Persecution
Kakure nenbutsu continued into the Edo period and were persecuted as secret organizations. In one instance, 1,700 believers were arrested. However, believers remained quite faithful and would send donations in secret to the Hongan-ji temples in Kyoto. Some members would appeal to Hongan-ji to help them with preserving orthodoxy.

Survival
Some kakure nenbutsu lineages departed from orthodox Shinshū and merged with yamabushi and other secret, esoteric practices. These groups, called kayakabe, continued to survive as of 1999, although there were virtually no young members.

The term kakushi nenbutsu (隠し念仏) refers to a different type of "hidden Amida Buddhism" practiced in the Tohoku region. Unlike kakure nenbutsu, kakushi nenbutsu still exist today as unregistered religious groups.

See also
 Banishment of Buddhist monks from Nepal
 Bodh Gaya bombings, in India 
 Buddhist crisis, in Vietnam
 Decline of Buddhism in the Indian subcontinent
 Four Buddhist Persecutions in China
 Haibutsu kishaku
 Persecution of Buddhists

References

Passing (sociology)
Pure Land Buddhism
History of Jōdo Shinshū
Religious policy in Japan
Buddhism in the Azuchi–Momoyama period
Buddhism in the Edo period
Persecution of Buddhists